Scott Cossu is an American new-age pianist. He released a large number of albums on Windham Hill between 1980 and 1992, some to considerable sales success: 1987's She Describes Infinity reached number 24 on the U.S. Billboard Top Contemporary Jazz Albums chart, and 1989's Switchback reached number 12 on the Top New Age Albums chart.

Cossu suffered life threatening head injuries after being struck by traffic in September, 1989, while walking to a meeting in Century City.  He made a full recovery.

He lives in Olympia, Washington.

Discography
 Still Moments (Windham Hill, 1980
 Spirals (Music is Medicine, 1981)
 Wind Dance (Windham Hill, 1981)
 Spirals (1983)
 Islands (Windham Hill, 1984)
 Reunion (Windham Hill, 1986)
 She Describes Infinity (Windham Hill, 1987)
 Switchback (Windham Hil, 1989)
 Mountain (Peter Roberts, 1991)
 Stained Glass Memories (Windham Hill, 1992)
 Retrospective (Windham Hill, 1992)
 When Spirits Fly (Miramar, 1998)
 Emerald Pathway (Alula, 2002)
 When Spirits Fly...Again (Alula, 2004)
 Tides Between Us (Silver Crow, 2007)
 Jazz, Boogie & Déjá Blues (Summit, 2012)
 Safe in Your Arms (Heart Dance, 2015)
 Memories of Water and Light (Heart Dance, 2020)

References

New-age musicians
Windham Hill Records artists
Year of birth missing (living people)
Living people
Heart Dance Records artists